Specula styliformis is a species of minute sea snails, marine gastropod molluscs or micromolluscs in the family Cerithiopsidae.

References

Further reading
 Powell A. W. B., New Zealand Mollusca, William Collins Publishers Ltd, Auckland, New Zealand 1979 

Cerithiopsidae
Gastropods of New Zealand
Gastropods described in 1908